Sir Alec Seath Kirkbride  (1897–1978) was a British diplomat, a proconsul, who served in Jordan and Palestine between 1920 and 1951.

Biography 

Kirkbride was born in Mansfield, Nottinghamshire, on 19 August 1897 to British parents and grew up in Egypt. He began his military career as an officer in the army of General Allenby from 1916 to 1921. In 1920, after the Battle of Maysalun and the fall of Faisal's government of Syria left Transjordan with no central authority, he was dispatched by the British government to Transjordan to help maintain order during this interregnum. "With a fine sense of history" he established the ephemeral but whimsically named "National Government of Moab" in Kerak with himself as president, which lasted until Abdullah took control of the country.  (His younger brother Alan similarly formed the "Ammonite Government" in Amman.) From 1922 to 1927 and from 1937 to 1939, he was governor of Acre and of the district of Galilee in Palestine. He was Deputy Resident in Transjordan from 1927 to 1937 and Resident from 1939 to 1946, and was one of Abdullah's leading British advisors.

In 1946 Transjordan gained independence. Kirkbride was then appointed ambassador of the United Kingdom to The Hashemite Kingdom of Transjordan (which became The Hashemite Kingdom of Jordan in 1949) and played an important diplomatic role during the 1948 Arab-Israeli war.

From 1952 to 1954, he was ambassador to Libya. He was appointed KCMG in the 1949 Birthday Honours.

He ended his career as director of the British Bank of the Middle East, later writing academic books and articles on the Middle East, including two volumes of memoirs.

Works

See also 
 Timeline of the Hashemite Kingdom of Jordan

Sources

External links
 Oxford Dictionary of National Biography Entry
Encyclopedia of the Modern Middle East and North Africa entry  Answers.com 

1897 births
1978 deaths
Royal Engineers officers
Administrators of Palestine
Ambassadors of the United Kingdom to Libya
Ambassadors of the United Kingdom to Jordan
Knights Commander of the Order of St Michael and St George
Officers of the Order of the British Empire
Recipients of the Military Cross